Sarhad Yawsip Hermiz Jammo (born 14 March 1941) is a Chaldean Catholic prelate of the Chaldean Catholic Church who presided over the Chaldean Catholic Eparchy of Saint Peter the Apostle of San Diego in the United States. He had been the bishop of this diocese since its inception on July 25, 2002.  His bishopric currently sits at St. Peter's Chaldean Catholic Cathedral in El Cajon, California. Mar Sarhad Jammo was born in Baghdad and ordained a priest on December 19, 1964. Following 38 years as a priest, he was elevated to the episcopate by the then Patriarch of Babylon of the Chaldeans, Mar Raphael I Bidawid. Upon his installment, his first post was to serve as bishop of the newly created eparchy, St. Peter the Apostle, which spans across nineteen states of the western United States. He retired on May 7, 2016.

Education
Born to an Assyrian family from Baghdad, he attended the Chaldean Patriarchal Seminary in Mosul for formation and left to Rome at the age of 17. He attended the Pontifical Urbaniana University, where he earned a master's degree in both philosophy and theology. He then pursued doctoral studies at the Pontifical Oriental Institute, where he earned a Doctor of Philosophy in Eastern Ecclesiastical Studies. His dissertation was titled, "The Structure of the Chaldean Mass". Bishop Jammo conducted instructional work at several prestigious universities. He taught at the Pontifical Oriental Institute in Rome, the University of Notre Dame, and the Catholic University of America in Washington, D.C.

Pastoral work
After finishing his studies in Rome, Jammo was appointed pastor of St. John the Baptist Parish in Baghdad, where he would serve from 1969 to 1974. At which time, he became the rector at the Chaldean Patriarchial Seminary in Mosul. In 1977, he was made associate pastor of Mother of God parish in Southfield, Michigan, where he would serve with Mar George Garmo. In 1983, he was appointed pastor of St. Joseph's Church in Troy, Michigan, in which capacity he would serve until his elevation to the episcopacy.

In 2002, Pope John Paul II created a second diocese for the Chaldean Catholic Church in the United States. The new diocese would divide the country between the east and west. Mar Sarhad Jammo would be given an apostolic seat to preside over the Eparchy of St. Peter the Apostle covering the western United States. Bishop Jammo has championed ecclesiastical renewal and reconciliation. In 2006, the Chaldean Catholic Church received Vatican approval on a reform of the Liturgy of Addai and Mari. The St. Peter Diocese has been the first to implement the reformed mass showing Bishop Jammo's passion and zeal for liturgical renewal.

Degrees and publications
 Master's in Philosophy, Pontifical Urbaniana University
 Master's in Theology, Pontifical Urbaniana University
 Doctorate in Eastern Ecclesiastical Studies, Pontifical Oriental Institute
 Doctoral Dissertation, "The Structure of the Chaldean Mass"
 Musical Play, "Between the Tigris and the Euphrates"
 Chaldean Patriarchial Liturgical Committee, "Presentation of the Reformed Chaldean Missal"

Bishop Jammo is an established author and historian of the Chaldean Catholic history, liturgy, and language. The Bishop has authored the following books/publications: "Introductory Chaldean," "Ancient and Modern Chaldean History," "The Chaldean Liturgy:  At the Gate of God," "Chaldean Grammar," "Emmanuel," "Chosen to Rescue:  Chaldean Exegis of the Old Testament (Old Pillars)," "Journeying to Emmaus: A Chaldean Catechism for First Communion"  and "L'Office du soir chaldéen au temps de Gabriel Qatraya" in L'Orient Syrien 12 (1967) 187–210 on the writings of Gabriel of Qatar.

On Assyrian identity
At a 1996 lecture on "Chaldeans in the Third Millennium," Jammo stated, "So often I had to clarify it because I think it's not understood, never understood, how much I write, and educate people. When I say "Chaldean,"—our forefathers when they gave us the name "Chaldean," did not mean, did not mean, did not mean that they are from people of Babylon. No! No! No! Don't be dumps, all of us, including me, to think that my forefathers didn't understand that living in Tel Keppe and Alqosh, they didn't know that they were Assyrians? Our forefathers understood. Our forefathers understood. When they said "Chaldeans," how someone living Tel Keppe didn't know that Nineveh was in front of his eyes, that he is not from Babylon. It's not meant in that way. Our forefathers searched for a comprehensive title, not only for one time or one period, but for the entirety of the people—all of it."

See also
 

 Catholic Church hierarchy
 Catholic Church in the United States
 Historical list of the Catholic bishops of the United States
 List of Catholic bishops of the United States
 Lists of patriarchs, archbishops, and bishops

References

External links
 Chaldean Catholic Eparchy of Saint Peter the Apostle of San Diego Official Site
 Catholic Hierarchy.org

Episcopal succession

1941 births
Living people
American Eastern Catholic bishops
Chaldean bishops
Iraqi Assyrian people
Iraqi emigrants to the United States
People from Baghdad
University of Notre Dame faculty
Catholic University of America faculty
Pontifical Oriental Institute alumni
Academic staff of the Pontifical Oriental Institute
Syriacists